In astrophysics, the Biermann battery is a process by which a weak seed magnetic field can be generated from zero initial conditions. The relative motion between electrons and ions is driven by rotation. The process was discovered by Ludwig Biermann in 1950.

References

Astrophysics